Blaženka Despot (January 1, 1930 in Zagreb – February 18, 2001 in Zagreb) was a Croatian philosopher, socialist feminist, and sociologist.

After finishing high school in Zagreb in 1948 and graduating in philosophy at the Faculty of Philosophy in Zagreb, she received her PhD in Ljubljana in 1970 with a thesis on humanity of the technological society. During the period 1956-64 she worked as a high school professor, and later as an assistant at the Department of Socialism at the Faculty of Mechanical Engineering. In 1974 she was appointed as an associate professor of sociology and political economy, receiving full professorship in 1980 as a Professor of Marxism, socialism and socialist self-management at the Veterinary Faculty in Zagreb. Since 1989 she worked as a research fellow at the Institute for Social Research at the University of Zagreb.

She published treatises and papers in journals Gledišta (1964–65, 1978, 1984), Praxis (1966–74), Kulturni radnik (1968, 1980, 1987), Naše teme (1968–70, 1982, 1984, 1988–90), Filozofija (1971–72), Revija za sociologiju (1972–73, 1989), Socijalizam (1978–81), Socijalizam u svetu (1978, 1981–82, 1984, 1986), Dometi (1980), Žena (1981–82), Filozofska istraživanja (1985 –86, 1990), Socijalna ekologija (1992) and others.

Works
 Humanitet tehničkog društva, 1971, Zagreb
 Ideologija proizvodnih snaga i proizvodna snaga ideologije, 1976, Osijek
 Plädoyer za dokolicu, 1976, Beograd
 Žensko pitanje i socijalističko samoupravljanje, 1987, Zagreb 
 Emancipacija i novi socijalni pokreti, 1989, Osijek

References

20th-century Croatian philosophers
Croatian sociologists
Croatian women sociologists
Croatian women philosophers
Faculty of Humanities and Social Sciences, University of Zagreb alumni
Academic staff of the University of Zagreb
Scientists from Zagreb
Socialist feminists
Croatian Marxists
Women Marxists
Marxist feminists
1930 births
2001 deaths